Peter Voss, Thief of Millions is a 1946 German comedy crime film directed by Karl Anton and starring Viktor de Kowa, Else von Möllendorff and Karl Schönböck. It was filmed between 1943 and 1945. It was based on the novel Peter Voss, Thief of Millions by E.G. Seeliger.

Cast
 Viktor de Kowa as Peter Voss
 Else von Möllendorff as Polly Petterson
 Karl Schönböck as Bobby Dodd
 Hans Leibelt as Van Gelder
 Kurt Seifert as Petterson
 Fritz Kampers as Fritz Mohr
 Georg Thomalla as Max Egon Flipp
 Werner Stock as Dodds Sekretär
 Gustav Bertram as Sam Parker

See also
 Überläufer

References

External links
 

1940s adventure comedy films
1940s crime comedy films
German adventure comedy films
German crime comedy films
East German films
Films directed by Karl Anton
Films based on German novels
Remakes of German films
German black-and-white films
Films set in the 1900s
Tobis Film films
1940s German-language films
1940s German films